Harsh Dev Singh is the Indian politician. He was Chairman of the Jammu and Kashmir National Panthers Party from 2012 to 2022. He won three elections serving as MLA for Ramnagar, constituency for 18 continuous years from 1996 till 2014. Under his tenure as the Minister of Education of Jammu and Kashmir from 2002 to 2008, English became a compulsory language from first grade. Harsh Dev joined Aam Aadmi Party on 7 May 2022, and on 17 October 2022 he became chairman of the party in Jammu and Kashmir. , on 16 Feb 2023 he resigned from aam Aadmi party and joined back panthers party to revive it.

Early life 
His father was Thakur Das, who died in 1996 the year Harsh Dev Singh won his first Legislative Assembly election.

Harsh Dev Singh graduated from Sainik School Nagrota in 1977. He earned a Bachelor's in Commerce followed by a Masters in English from Jammu University in 1982. He returned to Jammu University to earn a Bachelors of Law in 1991.

Career

Member of Jammu and Kashmir Legislative Assembly 
Harsh Dev Singh has won three elections from the Ramnagar constituency and served as a member of the Jammu and Kashmir Legislative Assembly continuously for 18 years from 1996 till 2014. In his first term he received the Best Legislator Award.

Minister of Education, 2002 
Harsh Dev Singh was sworn in as the minister of education after the 2002 Jammu and Kashmir Legislative Assembly elections. He was the first ever cabinet minister from the Panthers Party.

Under Harsh Dev, English became the compulsory language from first grade in all government schools. In his term as education minister the government opened 22 new degree colleges. Prior to which 32 colleges had been established in a 100 years time. They also opened over 10,000 new schools in the state.

To deal with teaching staff shortages in remote areas, Harsh Dev moved 2,800 teachers from cities back to their original rural postings.

Chairman of Panthers Party, 2012 
Bhim Singh who had been the Chairman of the Panthers Party for 30 years nominated Harsh Dev Singh to the position on 27 November 2012 to coincide with the 65th anniversary of the Instrument of Accession signed between the Maharaja and India.

Protest as Opposition in Legislative Assembly, 2014 
On 28 August 2014, Harsh Dev Singh led protests disturbing proceedings in the assembly house with placards demanding that the word secular be inserted into the Jammu and Kashmir constitution to bring it to parity with the Constitution of India. In the protest they also claimed that the BJP who had recently come into power in the Indian national government in May 2014 were destroying the secular fabric of the country.

House Arrest, 2019 
Following Revocation of the special status of Jammu and Kashmir in August 2019, Harsh Dev Singh was put under house arrest for over two months.

Aam Aadmi Party, 2022
Harsh Dev Singh joined Aam Aadmi Party on 7 May 2022 along with other leaders of the Jammu and Kashmir National Panthers Party, including Rajesh Pandgotra provincial president, Gagan Pratap Singh, Purushottam Parihar and Sudesh Dogra.

Dogra Heritage 
He has called for the recognition of Dogra heritage and the Dogri language citing the stable governance it once provided the nation under the Maharaja from 1846 to 1947 when the Kashmir conflict based on religious differences broke out in the state.

Personal life 
His uncle Bhim Singh was founder of the Panthers Party. His cousin Balwant Singh is the state President of the Panthers Party and his cousin Ankit Love is the leader of the One Love Party in Great Britain.

References

External Links 
Harsh Dev Singh on Headlines News via YouTube

Harsh Dev Singh on Twitter

Year of birth missing (living people)
Living people
Leaders of the Opposition in Jammu and Kashmir
20th-century Indian politicians
21st-century Indian politicians
University of Jammu alumni
Jammu and Kashmir MLAs 1996–2002
Jammu and Kashmir MLAs 2002–2008
Jammu and Kashmir MLAs 2008–2014